Camissonia lacustris is a flowering plant species commonly called grassland suncup. It is an evening primrose endemic to California, where it grows on the grasslands of the Sierra Nevada foothills. It is also known from an area in the Northern Coast Ranges in Lake County.

It is an annual herb producing an erect or spreading, sometimes bending or twisting, hairy stem approaching half a meter in maximum length. The leaves grow along the stem and are less than 4 centimeters long and linear or narrowly oval in shape. The nodding inflorescence produces flowers with yellow petals about half a centimeter in length. The petals sometimes have two red dots at their bases. The fruit is a straight wavy capsule which may be several centimeters long.

References

External links
Jepson Manual Treatment
Photo gallery

lacustris
Endemic flora of California
Flora of the Sierra Nevada (United States)